Pausa Records was a record label, active c. 1975–1986, which mainly issued jazz albums.

The company's name came from the fact that it was from the United States division of the Italian record company Produttori Associati (PA-USA.) In Italy, Produttori Associati was best known for soundtrack albums from Italian films. The label also released a few recordings by Italian progressive rock artists such as Maxophone. Many of its releases were reissues of MPS Records recordings.

In 1990, the label lost a $4 million lawsuit for failure to pay royalties.

Discography

References

External links

Pausa Records discography (partial)

Jazz record labels